Aleksandr Ivanovich Korolyov (Aлексáндр Ивáнович Королёв) Polish:  (Aleksander Korołiow) is a Transnistrian politician born in Wrocław, Poland on 24 October 1959. He is of Russian ethnicity.

Until 2006, he was the Minister of the Interior of the Pridnestrovian Moldavian Republic (PMR). He started to work in the ministry of the interior of the Moldavian SSR in 1985. When the PMR declared independence on 2 September 1990, Korolev continued his work in the same post but under the new government until 2000, when he was appointed the country's minister of the interior. Korolev holds PMR citizenship.

In the December 10, 2006 PMR presidential election he was elected to the post of Vice President of Transnistria as the running mate of Igor Smirnov.

He is the head of the PMR Security Council. Once a year, he also MC's the annual Miss PMR competition for charity.

References

External links
Aleksander Korolev, Minister of Internal Affairs
Cabinet of Transnistria

1959 births
Living people
Politicians from Wrocław
Transnistrian politicians
Government ministers of Transnistria
Vice presidents of Transnistria